Javaid Iqbal (b 1971) is an Anglican priest, the Archdeacon of Doncaster since 2020. 
 
Javaid Iqbal was born in Pakistan and educated at  the University of Birmingham. He studied for the priesthood at St John's College, Nottingham and was ordained in 1999. He worked in Lahore before coming to Evington in 2005. He was then Priest in charge at Thurmaston and then Team Vicar for The Fosse Benefice. He was then Team Rector at Aldenham until his appointment as Archdeacon.

References

1971 births
Alumni of the University of Birmingham
Archdeacons of Doncaster
Living people
Pakistani Christian religious leaders